Matthieu Chalmé (born 7 October 1980) is a French former professional footballer who played as a right-back.

Career

Born in Bruges, Chalmé started his career playing with the Bordeaux reserves and FC Libourne-Saint-Seurin in the French fourth tier. While at Libourne-Saint-Seurin he had a trial at Grimsby Town, but was not signed. At the age of 21, he signed his first professional contract with Ligue 1 club Lille OSC. He played with the club for five years, from 2002 to 2007. After many consistent seasons and appearances in both the Champions League and UEFA Cup, Chalmé was signed by FC Girondins de Bordeaux in the summer of 2007. He had made 128 Ligue 1 appearances for Lille.

Chalmé quickly broke through to the first team being a constant presence on the back line. During his second season with the club, he won his first major honour picking up the Trophée des champions at the beginning of the season against reigning Ligue 1 champions Lyon. The season provided more success and trophies for Chalmé as he picked up his first winners' medal in both Ligue 1 and the Coupe de la Ligue. The next season proved rather disappointing for both Bordeaux and Chalmé. While Bordeaux did win the 2009 Trophée des Champions against Guingamp in July, Bordeaux were less successful in the league. Chalmé and the club were performing well in Ligue 1 until a significant drop in form caused them to finish sixth and miss out on European competition for the next season. The right back also helped them reach the 2010 Coupe de la Ligue final, but lost 3–1 to Olympique de Marseille, with Chalmé scoring an own goal to seal the win for their opponents.

Honours
Lille
 UEFA Intertoto Cup: 2004

Bordeaux
 Ligue 1: 2008–09
 Coupe de la Ligue: 2009
 Trophée des Champions: 2008, 2009

References

External links
 

Living people
1980 births
People from Bruges, Gironde
Sportspeople from Gironde
Association football fullbacks
French footballers
Ligue 1 players
FC Libourne players
Lille OSC players
FC Girondins de Bordeaux players
AC Ajaccio players
US Lège Cap Ferret players
Footballers from Nouvelle-Aquitaine